The fractional part or decimal part of a non‐negative real number  is the excess beyond that number's integer part.

.

For a positive number written in a conventional positional numeral system (such as binary or decimal), its fractional part hence corresponds to the digits appearing after the radix point. The result is a real number in the half-open interval [0, 1).

For negative numbers

By consequence, we may get, for example, three different values for the fractional part of just one : let it be −1.3, its fractional part will be 0.7 according to the first definition, 0.3 according to the second definition, and −0.3 according to the third definition, whose result can also be obtained in a straightforward way by
.

These two definitions of fractional-part function also provide idempotence.

The fractional part defined via difference from ⌊ ⌋ is usually denoted by curly braces:

Relation to continued fractions
Every real number can be essentially uniquely represented as a continued fraction, namely as the sum of its integer part and the reciprocal of its fractional part which is written as the sum of its integer part and the reciprocal of its fractional part, and so on.

See also
 Circle group
 Equidistributed sequence
 One-parameter group
 Pisot–Vijayaraghavan number
 Significand

References

Arithmetic
Unary operations